Loflammia is a genus of lichenized fungi in the family Pilocarpaceae. It has five species. The genus was circumscribed by Czech lichenologist Antonín Vězda in 1986, with L. flammea as the type species.

References

Pilocarpaceae
Lichen genera
Lecanorales genera
Taxa described in 1986
Taxa named by Antonín Vězda